Philippe Caux (born 25 October 1973 in Chamonix, Haute-Savoie, France) is a French curler.

He participated at the 2002 Winter Olympics where the French men's team finished in tenth place.

Teams

References

External links

Living people
1972 births
People from Chamonix
Sportspeople from Haute-Savoie
French male curlers
Curlers at the 2002 Winter Olympics
Olympic curlers of France